John Edward Days (10 July 1872 – 19 August 1947) was an English cricketer, who played two first-class games for Worcestershire. He took only two wickets, both on debut against Warwickshire in 1900, but both victims were notable players: future Warwickshire captain Tom Fishwick and Test cricketer Willie Quaife. His other match was against Surrey almost seven years later, but this was a game in which he did not bowl at all.

He was born in Peopleton, Worcestershire; he died in Walsall, then Staffordshire at the age of 75.

External links
 

1872 births
1947 deaths
English cricketers
Worcestershire cricketers
Staffordshire cricketers